Electromethes is an extinct genus of beetle closely resembling members of the family Omethidae. It existed in what is now Lithuania during the Eocene epoch. It was described by Sergey V. Kazantsev in 2012, and contains the species Electromethes alleni, which was found within Baltic amber.

References

Fossils of Russia
Lampyridae genera
Prehistoric beetle genera
Fossil taxa described in 2012
Eocene insects